EZ or Ez may refer to:

Arts, entertainment and media
 E-Z Rollers, a British drum and bass group
 EZ Rock, a brand of radio stations in Canada
 Ezekiel "EZ" Reyes, a fictional character in Mayans M.C.
 E.Z. Taylor, a fictional character in Three's a Crowd

People
 DJ EZ, a British DJ
 E. Z. Money (Jason Broyles, born 1973), American professional wrestler

Transportation
 E-ZPass, an American electronic toll collection system 
 EZ TAG, an American electronic toll collection system in Houston, Texas
 Sun-Air of Scandinavia, IATA airline code EZ
 Evergreen International Airlines, IATA airline code formerly EZ

Other uses
 EZ Communications, former American corporation
 EZ Industries, former Australian company
 E–Z notation, in chemistry
 eZ Platform, open-source software system
 E-Z Sort card, an edge-notched card

See also 

Easy (disambiguation)
EZ Aquarii, a triple star system
EZ Canis Majoris, a binary star
EZ-DOS, an OEM version of DR DOS
EZ Word, an early word processor 
EZcode, a barcode system
Ezhou, a city in Hubei, China